Tahjon "TJ" Starks (born September 11, 1998) is an American professional basketball player for Kolossos Rodou of the Greek Basket League. He played college basketball for Texas A&M and Cal State Northridge.

Early life and high school career
Starks attended Lancaster High School and played under head coach Ferrin Douglas. As a junior, he averaged 12 points, eight rebounds and three assists per game. Starks led the Tigers to its second consecutive Class 5A State Championship and scored 20 points during the championship-game win against Elkins High School. As a senior, he was selected as the 2017 5A Region II District 10 Offensive Player of the Year as well as a Class 5A All-State selection by the Texas Association of Basketball Coaches. Starks was regarded as a three-star prospect and committed to Texas A&M in June 2016 over an offer from Oklahoma.

College career
As a freshman, Starks made 15 starts and averaged 9.9 points and 2.3 assists per game. He helped lead Texas A&M to the Sweet 16 of the NCAA Tournament and scored 21 points in an upset of North Carolina in the second round. Starks earned SEC All-Freshman Team honors. He made a buzzer-beating three-pointer on January 12, 2019, to propel the Aggies to an 81-80 win over Alabama. On February 26, Starks sustained a right shoulder injury in a loss against LSU, which required hospitalization and forced him to miss the rest of the season. He averaged 12.3 points, 2.2 rebounds, and 3.5 assists per game as a sophomore. Starks missed the first two games of his junior season with an ankle injury he sustained during an exhibition game. On November 14, 2019, he was suspended indefinitely due to being arrested for possession of two ounces or less of marijuana. 

Starks entered the transfer portal and was contacted by Mo Williams, an assistant coach at Cal State Northridge. Despite not being familiar with the program, he committed to the Matadors over interest from DePaul. Starks sat out the rest of the season as a redshirt and was expected to help replace the production of the departing Lamine Diane and Terrell Gomez. On February 19, 2021, he scored a career-high 31 points in a 75-74 loss to Hawaii. As a redshirt junior, Starks averaged 21.7 points, 3.0 rebounds, 3.0 assists and 1.4 steals per game. He was named to the First Team All-Big West as well as Big West Newcomer of the Year. Following the season, he declared for the 2021 NBA draft.

Professional career
On September 5, 2021, Starks signed his first professional contract with Rytas Vilnius of the Lithuanian Basketball League. 

In October 2021, Starks joined the Wisconsin Herd after a successful tryout. 

On December 11, 2021, Starks signed with Nevėžis of the Lithuanian Basketball League. In 10 games, he averaged 18.9 points, 2.9 rebounds and 4.5 assists.

On March 26, 2022, Starks signed with Semt77 Yalovaspor of the Turkish Basketball Super League for the rest of the season. He averaged 13.2 points, 2.8 rebounds and 3.2 assists per game. 

On July 30, 2022, Starks signed with Greek club Kolossos Rodou.

References

External links
 Texas A&M Aggies bio
 Cal State Northridge Matadors bio

1998 births
Living people
American men's basketball players
American expatriate basketball people in Greece
American expatriate basketball people in Lithuania
American expatriate basketball people in Turkey
Basketball players from Texas
BC Rytas players
BC Nevėžis players
Cal State Northridge Matadors men's basketball players
Kolossos Rodou B.C. players
People from Lancaster, Texas
Point guards
Sportspeople from the Dallas–Fort Worth metroplex
Texas A&M Aggies men's basketball players
Wisconsin Herd players
Yalovaspor BK players